Good Samaritan Hospital is located in Vincennes, Indiana. It is the main hospital for  Knox County, Indiana and Lawrence County, Illinois. It is located along Willow Street and Sixth Street on Vincennes' South Side.

Resources
Good Samaritan Hospital Site

Hospitals in Indiana
Healthcare in Southwestern Indiana
Buildings and structures in Knox County, Indiana